Saint-Just, Saint-Juste, St-Juste, or St Just may refer to:

Music 
Saint Just (album)
Saint Just (band), an Italian progressive rock band

Places

France 
 Saint-Just (Lyon), a section of the city of Lyon
 Saint-Just, Ain, in the Ain département
 Saint-Just, Ardèche, in the Ardèche département
 Saint-Just, Cantal, in the Cantal département
 Saint-Just, Cher, in the Cher département
 Saint-Just, Dordogne, in the Dordogne département
 Saint-Just, Eure, in the Eure département
 Saint-Just, Hérault, in the Hérault département
 Saint-Just, Ille-et-Vilaine, in the Ille-et-Vilaine département
 Saint-Just, Puy-de-Dôme, in the Puy-de-Dôme département
 Saint-Just-Chaleyssin, in the Isère département
 Saint-Just-d'Avray, in the Rhône département
 Saint-Just-de-Claix, in the Isère département
 Saint-Just-en-Bas, in the Loire département
 Saint-Just-en-Brie, in the Seine-et-Marne département
 Saint-Just-en-Chaussée, in the Oise département
 Saint-Just-en-Chevalet, in the Loire département
 Saint-Just-et-le-Bézu, in the Aude département
 Saint-Just-et-Vacquières, in the Gard département
 Saint-Just-Ibarre, in the Pyrénées-Atlantiques département
 Saint-Just-la-Pendue, in the Loire département
 Saint-Just-le-Martel, in the Haute-Vienne département
 Saint-Just-Luzac, in the Charente-Maritime département
 Saint-Just-Malmont, in the Haute-Loire département
 Saint-Just-près-Brioude, in the Haute-Loire département
 Saint-Just-Saint-Rambert, in the Loire département
 Saint-Just-Sauvage, in the Marne département
 Saint-Just-sur-Dive, in the Maine-et-Loire département
 Saint-Just-sur-Viaur, in the Aveyron département

Puerto Rico
 St. Just, Trujillo Alto, Puerto Rico, a barrio

UK 
St Just in Penwith, Cornwall
St Just in Roseland, Cornwall

People with the surname
Benjamin St-Juste (born 1997), Canadian player of American football
Emmanuel Marie Michel Philippe Fréteau de Saint-Just (1745–1794), twice president of the National Assembly
Jason St Juste (born 1985), Kittitian footballer
Jerry St. Juste (born 1996), Dutch footballer
Laurore St. Juste, Haitian historian
Louis Antoine de Saint-Just (1767–1794), a legislative, military and political leader during the French Revolution
Mark Saint Juste (born 1968), American television and music producer
Marguerite St. Just, a character in The Scarlet Pimpernel
Oscar Saint-Just, a character in the Honorverse books by David Weber

See also
 Justus (disambiguation)